Panagiotis Louka (born 8 September 2000) is a Cypriot footballer who plays as a forward for Ypsonas, on loan from AEL Limassol.

Club career

Atalanta

Loan to iClinic Sereď
He joined ŠKF Sereď on loan from Atalanta Bergamo in August 2019.

He made his professional Fortuna liga debut for ŠKF Sereď on 14 September 2019 in a game against Ružomberok. He substituted Maj Rorič in the 68th minute.

References

External links
 

2000 births
Living people
Sportspeople from Nicosia
Cypriot footballers
Cypriot expatriate footballers
Cyprus youth international footballers
Association football forwards
ŠKF Sereď players
FC Tsarsko Selo Sofia players
AEL Limassol players
Slovak Super Liga players
Cypriot First Division players
Cypriot Second Division players
First Professional Football League (Bulgaria) players
Expatriate footballers in Italy
Cypriot expatriate sportspeople in Italy
Expatriate footballers in Slovakia
Cypriot expatriate sportspeople in Slovakia
Expatriate footballers in Bulgaria